Mark Blasdel (born June 21, 1976) is a Republican member of the Montana Legislature.  He previously served in the Montana House of Representatives from 2007-2015, representing House District 10 which includes the Somers area.

He graduated from Flathead High School, attended Flathead Valley Community College, and received a Bachelor of Arts degree in hospitality and business administration from the University of Nevada, Reno.

References

|-

|-

1976 births
21st-century American politicians
Living people
Politicians from Kalispell, Montana
Presidents of the Montana Senate
Republican Party members of the Montana House of Representatives
Republican Party Montana state senators
Speakers of the Montana House of Representatives
University of Nevada alumni